Eucereon is a genus of tiger moths in the family Erebidae. The genus was erected by Jacob Hübner in 1819.

Species
The genus includes the following species:

Former species
Eucereon relegata Schaus, 1911

References

 
Euchromiina
Moth genera